Blaine "Zippy" Cook is the former lead singer of the early 1980s Seattle political punk band the Fartz. After they disbanded, he went on to front the thrash oriented the Accüsed. Cook currently fronts Toe Tag and Accused A.D.. He was also the featured vocalist on a release, Horror Holocaust, by the thrash/death metal band Denial Fiend. Replacing Kam Lee in the band.

Blaine and wife Rahel used to own Zippy's Giant Burgers in West Seattle. Zippy's was a cult favorite in Seattle, having garnered several awards, including Best Burger by the Best of Western Washington and Best Burger (non-beef) by the Seattle Weekly. Zippy's closed its doors for the final time on July 10, 2022, citing staffing, inflation and an unreasonable landlord.

References

External links 
http://www.myspace.com/toetagofficial
http://www.myspace.com/zippysgiantburgers

Singers from Washington (state)
Living people
American male singers
Year of birth missing (living people)